The 2016 Big East Conference women's soccer season was the fourth season for the newly realigned Big East Conference.

The St. John's Red Storm are the defending regular season champions. The Butler Bulldogs are the defending tournament champions.

Changes from 2015 

 None

Teams

Stadiums and locations

Regular season

Results

Rankings

Postseason

Big East tournament

Tournament details to be announced.

NCAA tournament

All-Big East awards and teams

See also 
 2016 NCAA Division I women's soccer season
 2016 Big East Conference Women's Soccer Tournament
 2016 Big East Conference men's soccer season

References 

 
2016 NCAA Division I women's soccer season